Eravallan is a tribal Dravidian language related to Tamil. It is spoken by the Eravallan people in Kerala and Tamil Nadu.

References

Tamil languages